Sir Thomas Lombe (5 September 1685 – 8 January 1739) was an English merchant and developer of machinery for silk throwing.

Early life
He was born the eldest son of Henry Lombe, a worsted weaver of Norwich, who died in 1695, leaving his older sons Thomas and John under the care of his executors, while the younger sons Benjamin and John were to be brought up by their mother, Henry Lombe's second wife.

In the early years of the 18th century Lombe found his way to London, where he was apprenticed to Samuel Totton, a mercer, and was admitted to the freedom of the Mercers' Company in 1707. In the same year he became a freeman of the city of London, and he eventually established himself as a merchant.

Silk manufacturer

In 1718 Lombe obtained a patent (No. 422) for "three sorts of engines never before made or used in Great Britaine, one to winde the finest raw silk, another to spin, and the other to twist the finest Italian raw silk into organzine in great perfection, which was never before done in this country." Lombe employed his half-brother John Lombe to learn Italian silk processes.

The Lombes set up a new mill at Derby in 1719, on an island in the River Derwent, adjacent to a disused mill that had belonged to Thomas Cotchett and was built by George Sorocold. It eventually became a lucrative concern, known as Lombe's Mill. The patent expired in 1732, when Lombe petitioned Parliament for an extension, opposed by cotton and worsted spinners. The bill was thrown out, but subsequently an act rewarded Lombe with £14,000, one of the conditions being that he should deposit models of his machinery in a public institution. Models were placed in the Tower of London.

Public life, and death
Lombe was an alderman of Bassishaw ward in the city of London, and was chosen sheriff of London in 1727. He was knighted on 8 July of the same year, when he attended at court to present a congratulatory address from the city to George II on his accession. He died on 8 January 1739 at his house in Old Jewry.

Legacy
Lombe's Mill was sold to Samuel Lloyd and William Wilson, after Thomas Lombe's death. It continued to spin silk until 1890, when it partly collapsed. In the 1740s Charles Roe built mills based on Lombe's, in Macclesfield. A description of Lombe's machinery was in Rees's Cyclopædia.

Family
Lombe married Elizabeth Turner. He left a fortune of £120,000, bequeathed equally to his widow and his two daughters, Hannah and Mary Turner. His daughter Mary Turner married on 24 April 1749, James Maitland, 7th Earl of Lauderdale. Lady Lombe died on 18 November 1753.

Notes

Attribution

1685 births
1739 deaths
English merchants